Al-Wajiz fi Fiqh al-Imam al-Shafi'i or The Condensed in Imam Shafi’i’s Jurisprudence is a concise summary of Shafi’i Fiqh and  (the science of juridical disagreement) written by Imam al-Ghazali the leading juristconsult of his time. It mentions the contrary opinions of Al-Shafi'i including Abu Hanifa, Malik Ibn Anas and Al-Muzani. This book is considered one of the five major works in Shafi'i school of jurisprudence.

Development
The book “al-Wajeez” is a selection of series of Al-Ghazāli books on Shafi’i jurisprudence, entitled al-Baseet, al-Waseet and al-Wajeez. The premise of all these books is based on Nihayat al-Matlab fi Dirayat al-Madhhab authored by Imam al-Haramayn al-Juwayni, master of al-Ghazāli. This was elucidated by Ibn Hajar al-Haytami when he said:

"Al-Ghazāli has abridged the book “Nihāyat” (i.e. Al-Juwayni’s book) in a lengthy and rich summary and named it “al-Baseet”; then he abridged further and named it “al-Waseet” which in its turn was subject to additional abridgment and named it “al-Wajeez.” Then came Imam , who concluded a brief explanation of “Al-Wajeez”, then a detailed one, which turned out to be an unmatched compilation in the Shāfi’i School of Thought.”

Commentary
This work alone has had at least 100 commentaries by many jurists.

See also
 On Legal Theory of Muslim Jurisprudence

References

Books by Al-Ghazali
Books about Islamic jurisprudence
12th-century books
Persian literature
Shafi'i